Ellensburg School District 401 is a public school district headquartered in Ellensburg, Washington.  It serves the city of Ellensburg and surrounding areas.  
As of the 2022-2023 school year, the district has an enrollment of 3,250 students. The superintendent is Jinger Haberer.

Schools

High schools
 Ellensburg High School
 Ellensburg Choice Schools 
 This school is houses an alternative high school program serving Grades 9-12, ALE (Alternative Learning Experience) program, Ellensburg Virtual Academy, and the Ellensburg Parent Partnership Program.    The program is located on the campus of Ellensburg High School.

Middle school
 Morgan Middle School

Primary schools
 Ida-Nason Aronica Elementary School
 Lincoln Elementary
 Mount Stuart Elementary
 Valley View Elementary

References

External links 

Ellensburg High School
Ellensburg Choice Schools
Morgan Middle School
Ida-Nason Aronica Elementary School
Lincoln Elementary School
Mt. Staurt Elementary School
Valley View Elementary School

School districts in Washington (state)
Education in Kittitas County, Washington